Arthouse musical is a combination of an art film and a film musical.

Notable arthouse musicals

20th Century
The Umbrellas of Cherbourg (Jacques Demy, 1964)
The Young Girls of Rochefort (Jacques Demy, 1967)
Cabaret (Bob Fosse, 1972)
The Rocky Horror Picture Show (Jim Sharman, 1975)
All That Jazz (Bob Fosse, 1979)
Pennies from Heaven (Herbert Ross, 1981)
Golden Eighties (Chantal Ackerman, 1986)
Under the Cherry Moon (Prince, 1986)
Strictly Ballroom (Baz Luhrmann, 1992)
Everyone Says I Love You (Woody Allen, 1996)
Little Voice (Mark Herman, 1998)

21st Century
Billy Elliot (Stephen Daldry, 2000)
Dancer in the Dark (Lars von Trier, 2000)
Moulin Rouge (Baz Luhrmann, 2001)
8 Femmes (François Ozon, 2002)
Once (John Carney, 2007)
Cyrano (Joe Wright, 2021)
Annette (Leos Carax, 2022)

Notable arthouse musical directors
Leos Carax
Jacques Demy
Bob Fosse
Baz Luhrmann

See also
Postmodernist film
Arthouse action film
Arthouse animation
Art horror
Arthouse science fiction film
New Hollywood

References

1960s in film
1970s in film
1980s in film
1990s in film
2000s in film
2020s in film
Musical films
Postmodern art